Hi Fashion is an American electropop duo, consisting of Jen DM and Rick Gradone. The band's music features electronic, upbeat pop songs, many with ironic and humorous lyrics. DM and Gradone are both originally from New York but both are now based in Los Angeles.  Currently, Hi Fashion has released two Eps, their debut, "Sprechen Sie Hi Fashion?" and 2013 follow up "You Are Gorgeous."

Biography
Gradone and DM met in a gay bar in New York City. Gradone flirted with DM, thinking she was a man. After this, the pair became friends and DM invited Gradone to a benefit concert, where she was performing. Hearing DM sing, Gradone invited DM to form a band together, which she refused. Gradone then sent DM three tracks to listen to and asked again if she would work with him. DM had plans to start an all-woman metal band but agreed to join with Gradone, and thus Hi Fashion was formed.

Originally, the pair named the band "Hi-Fashion $5.99" and later changed it to "Hi-Fashion $9.99" and eventually dropped the price tag and became known simply as "Hi-Fashion".

Hi Fashion's first single, "Amazing" was released in July 2010, and their debut EP "Sprechen Sie Hi Fashion?" a year later, in July 2011. Since the release of said EP, Hi Fashion have released several singles on to iTunes with music videos to accompany them via YouTube.

A second EP by the duo was announced in April 2013, to be titled "You Are Gorgeous". The band ensued to raise the funds needed to support and produce the album by use of Kickstarter, where they successfully raised over $25,000. The album was released in July of that year.

The band's style is most noted in their music videos for their singles, demonstrating a lavish and outlandish fashion style, also strongly mirrored in their live performances. Many of the clothing items are made by the band themselves.

On November 16, 2017, the band announced on their Facebook page that they are disbanding.

Discography
 Studio albums
Sprechen Sie Hi Fashion? (July 2011)
You Are Gorgeous (July 2013)

 Singles
Amazing (July 2010)
You Tuk my Luk (March 2012)
Special Delivery Love (July 2012)
Eighteen (April 2013)
Lighthouse (July 2013)
Pupusa (October 2013)
Freak Your Halls (December 2013)
Where is the Party? (April 2015)
Mother Sister Father Brother (August 2015)

In popular culture
The first single, "Amazing", was featured on the teaser for RuPaul's Drag Race (season 6) which was released on December 9, 2013 and more recently on the 2015 film, The Duff.
"Lighthouse" was featured on the 2014 film, G.B.F., and also on the film's soundtrack.

References

External links
 Official Website
 Homorazzi Article
 MeetsObsession Article
 Nark Article

American musical duos
Electronic music duos
American electronic music groups
American LGBT musicians
Musical groups established in 2009